The Local Rag may refer to:

The Local Rag (newspaper), a newspaper published in Red Lodge, Montana
The Local Rag (film), a 1986 Australian TV movie